Coláiste Choilm is a mixed second-level school in Ballincollig in Cork, Ireland. The school was founded in 1987 to meet demand for second-level education in the rapidly growing satellite town of Ballincollig. 

As of September 2011, there were 649 boys and 626 girls in attendance with over 100 staff. The school won "Best School" in the 2013 BT Young Scientist and Technology Exhibition. In 2014,And won the same award again in 2020, the school had its first ever overall winner in the same competition.

References

External links 
 

Secondary schools in County Cork
1987 establishments in Ireland
Educational institutions established in 1987